The international or global version of the Ford Ranger is a series of pickup trucks sold by Ford under the Ranger nameplate mainly for markets outside the Americas since 1998. The 1998–2011 international Ranger models were jointly developed with Mazda, sharing the same assembly line and most parts with the Mazda B-Series and its successor, the Mazda BT-50. It is a successor of the Ford Courier as the Mazda-based Ford global pickup. The vehicles are mainly produced in the manufacturing plants in Rayong, Thailand and Pretoria, South Africa.

The first-generation Ranger was produced from 1998 to 2006, with a facelift in 2002. The 2006–2011 second-generation Ranger was introduced after the B-Series was replaced by the Mazda BT-50. The globally-marketed T6 Ranger has been produced since 2011. In contrast to the previous versions, the T6 platform-based Ranger was designed by Ford Australia, and is also marketed in North America since 2019.



First generation (PE/PG/PH; 1998) 

The 1998–2006 Ranger/Courier (codenamed PE, PG and PH in Australia) is a rebadged fifth-generation (UN) Mazda B-Series with a reworked front fascia as a differentiation. Production at the AutoAlliance Thailand plant began in May 1998, being one of the first vehicles to roll off the production line at the newly built joint venture manufacturing plant. This model was sold as the Ford Courier in Australia and New Zealand.

The turbo-diesel engine features a single overhead camshaft design, three valves per cylinder, intercooler, indirect fuel injection and two internal balance shafts to reduce vibration and noise. Ford and Mazda has decided not to use a conventional radial type turbocharger on its new engine. Instead, a new diagonal exhaust gas flow turbocharger is used which was claimed to improve charging efficiency, reduce turbo lag and improve throttle response at low speeds.

The vehicle had received two stars of Australian New Car Assessment Program (ANCAP) safety rating in 2006. Dual front airbags were optional and were not fitted to the test vehicle.

Facelift  
The late 2002 facelift models feature a new grille, headlights, front bumper and front fenders and improved interiors. It has been restyled to mimic the design of the North American F-Series trucks. Power steering is now standard across the range and swaps its variable ratio for a new fixed gear ratio. In 2005, Ford released the 2.5-litre common rail injection turbo-diesel engine. The engine features a dual-mass flywheel which sharpens responses while also reducing vibration and a variable geometry turbocharger is employed to cut turbo lag and extend the torque band. The common-rail architecture of the Ranger's engine has improved its noise, vibration and harshness (NVH) levels.  

In the same year, Ford also introduced a V6 engine option for the Courier. The fuel tank is also increased to 80 litres, up 10 litres from the models fitted with the smaller engines. Ford engineers also retuned the front shock absorbers for improved ride quality and body control over rough roads for the V6 model compared to the inline-four models.

Second generation (PJ/PK; 2006) 

The 2006–2011 Ranger (codenamed PJ and PK in Australia) is an updated version of the previous generation. The design of the PJ Ranger was previewed by the Ford 4-Trac Concept which debuted at the Bangkok Auto Show in December 2005. The concept vehicle design development was led by Ford Asia-Pacific chief designer, Paul Gibson. The production version was designed and built in Thailand in tandem with the Mazda BT-50.

While the previous generation Ranger is a rebadge of the Mazda B-Series with a different fascia, the Ranger now has its distinct styling designed by former Ford Australia design chief, Simon Butterworth. As the result, the PJ Ranger picks up the new corporate design that appeared on several Ford North American light trucks. Although the changes are drastic compared to the PE/PG/PH Ranger hence Ford's "all-new" claim, it is instead a comprehensive redevelopment of the old model.

In Australia and New Zealand, the Courier nameplate was dropped in favour of Ranger to distance itself from a 'basic workhorse' image and to align the model name with its Asian and European counterparts.

Ford did not offer a petrol engine option in the PJ/PK Ranger, instead offering a choice of two four-cylinder common-rail turbo-diesel engines, one a 2.5-litre, the other a 3.0-litre. The 2.5-litre Duratorq engine is a DOHC 16-valve turbo-diesel unit, featuring Bosch common rail direct fuel injection and a variable geometry turbocharger. Both engines were double-overhead camshaft.

Facelift 
The Ranger received a facelift in 2009. Designated as the PK Ranger, it has received new front and rear styling which was previously previewed by the Ford Ranger Max Concept at the 2008 Thailand International Motor Expo. It featured a new three-bar grille, new front bumper, and a redesigned bonnet. Other changes include the clear tail lamp design, new exterior mirrors, side air vents and new tailgate cladding. A new flagship Wildtrak sports trim was also introduced. Inside changes include newly designed seats and door panels, as well as new colors and trimmings.

Third generation (P375/PX; 2011) 

The Ranger nameplate was consolidated onto a single globally-marketed model, the P375 Ranger, in 2011. Based on the T6 platform, it replaced both the 1998–2012 Ranger which was sold in North and South America, and the Mazda-based PJ/PK Ranger which was sold in Asia-Pacific, Latin America and Europe regions. Designed by Ford Australia, the T6 Ranger was unveiled at the Australian International Motor Show in Sydney in October 2010, with its production started in mid-2011. The P375 Ranger is also built and sold in North America starting from January 2019.

Fourth generation (P703; 2022) 

The P375 Ranger is succeeded by the P703 Ranger, which is the fourth-generation international Ranger and the fifth-generation Ranger in North America. It was introduced in November 2021, continuing to use the T6 platform with revisions.

References

External links 

 

Ranger (Mazda-based)
Cars introduced in 1998
2000s cars
2010s cars
Pickup trucks
Rear-wheel-drive vehicles
All-wheel-drive vehicles
ANCAP pick-ups